Carlo Maria Polvani (born 28 July 1965) is a Roman Catholic priest and adjunct under-secretary at the Pontifical Council for Culture. Before this he worked in the Section for General Affairs.

Polvani was born in Milan. He was educated in the Istituto Leone XIII and then in the Collège Stanislas, he earned a Baccalauréat Français Section Scientifique avec mention in 1982. He enrolled in McGill University, Canada in the Department of Biochemistry and received in 1985, a B.Sc. with honours and in 1990 a Ph.D Dean's Honour List, for his research on the enzymatic mechanism of the Sodium Potassium ATPase.

He decided to become a priest, and took a degree of Master of Divinity with distinction, in 1993, at the Weston School of Theology in Cambridge, Massachusetts, USA. He received from the Pontifical Gregorian University in Rome, a Licence summa cum laude in Canon Law (JCL) in 1995 and a Specialization summa cum laude in Jurisprudence and Forensic Psychology in 1996. He was admitted to the Pontifical Lombard Seminary in Rome, and was ordained a priest for the Archdiocese of Milan by Cardinal Martini on 14 February 1998. He completed his Doctorate in Canon Law summa cum laude in 1999 from the Gregoriana with the examination of a distinctively canonical activity: the authentic interpretation of laws.

He was summoned to the Pontifical Ecclesiastical Academy in Rome, and was called to the Diplomatic Service of the Holy See, on 1 July 1999, to serve as Secretary in the Apostolic Nunciature in México. He was then called to the Secretariat of State, and in 2007 was put in charge of the Information and Documentation Office in the Section for General Affairs, as well as being the Representative of the Holy See in the Government Advisory Committee of the Internet Corporation for Assigned Names and Numbers (ICANN).

Polvani was a witness during the trial of Claudio Sciarpelletti, computer specialist at the Secretariat of State in the Vatileaks scandal. Polvani is Archbishop Carlo Maria Viganò's nephew. He was appointed Prelate of Honour of His Holiness in 2013.

In July 2014 he was appointed a member of the Committee for the reform for the Vatican Media, with members Lord Patten of Barnes (president), Msgr. Lucio Adrián Ruiz, Msgr. Paul Tighe, Fr. Giacomo Ghisani, Fr. Eric Salobir, O.P. Prof. Giovanni Maria Vian, Gregory Erlandson, George Yeo, Daniela Frank and Leticia Soberon.

The committee was appointed to propose reforms for the Vatican Media. The committee is to publish a report and a reform plan within 12 months after considering the report of the Pontifical Commission for Reference on the Organisation of the Economic-Administrative Structure of the Holy See. The objectives are to adapt the Holy See media to changing trends, enhance coordination, and make substantial financial savings. Following initiatives such as the Pope App  and Pope Francis's Twitter account, digital channels will be set up for the Pope's messages to reach the faithful around the world, especially young people.

He worked in the Section for General Affairs until the 26 July 2019 when he was appointed adjunct under-secretary at the Pontifical Council for Culture.

References

Living people
1965 births
20th-century Italian Roman Catholic priests
Diplomats of the Holy See
Pope Francis
Officials of the Roman Curia
McGill University Faculty of Science alumni
Boston College School of Theology and Ministry alumni
Pontifical Gregorian University alumni
Pontifical Ecclesiastical Academy alumni
Clergy from Milan
21st-century Italian Roman Catholic priests